The Al-Fayoum Stadium was a multi-purpose stadium located in Fayoum, Egypt. It was used mostly for football and serves as the home stadium of Misr El Makasa.  The stadium had a capacity of 20,000 people. This stadium is permanently closed.

References

Football venues in Egypt
Multi-purpose stadiums in Egypt